Paolo Vidoz (born 21 August 1970) is an Italian former professional boxer who competed from 2001 to 2011 and held the European heavyweight title from 2005 to 2006. As an amateur Vidoz won a bronze medal at the 2000 Olympics in the super-heavyweight bracket, as well as a bronze medal at the 1997 and 1999 World Championships and a silver medal at the 2000 European Championships.

Amateur career
He won Olympic Bronze in 2000 at Super Heavyweight after beating Calvin Brock and Samuel Peter but lost to Audley Harrison.

Amateur highlights 
 Italian Superheavyweight Champion 1991, 1993, 1995–1997, 1999
1996 competed at the European Championships in Vejle, Denmrl. Results were:
Defeated Vasile Ciocan (Romania) RSC-2
Defeated Miroslav Gavenciak (Slovakia) PTS
Lost to René Monse (Germany) DSQ-3
1996 competed as a Superheavyweight at the Atlanta Olympics. Results was:
Lost to Alexis Rubalcaba (Cuba) RSCH-1
1997 3rd place at the World Championships in Budapest, Hungary. Results were:
Defeated Patrick Halberg (Denmark) PTS
Defeated Henryk Zatyka (Poland) PTS
Defeated Ahmed El Akad (Egypt) PTS
Lost to Alexis Rubalcaba (Cuba) PTS
1997 won the Mediterranean Games in Bari, Italy beating Sinan Samil Sam of Turkey in the final.
1998 won the Goodwill Games in New York, USA. Results were:
Defeated Keith Govan (USA) PTS (8-1)
Defeated Dmitriy Diagilev (Russia) PTS (8-2)
Defeated Alexis Rubalcaba (Cuba) PTS (9-3)
1998 competed at the European Championships in Minsk, Belarus. Results were:
Defeated Rimantas Priczmantas (Lithuania) PTS
Lost to Vladimir Lazebnik (Ukraine) PTS
1999 3rd place at the World Championships in Houston, USA. Results were:
Defeated Patrice L'Heureux (Canada) PTS
Defeated Alexis Rubalcaba (Cuba) PTS (2-5)
Lost to Mukhtarkhan Dildabekov (Kazakhstan) PTS
2000 2nd place at the European Championships in Tampere, Finland. Results were:
Defeated Kurban Guenerbakan (Turkey) RSCI-1
Defeated Kestutis Bitkevicius (Lithuania) RSC-4
Defeated Bagrat Oghanian (Armenia) PTS
Lost to Alexei Lezin (Russia) PTS
2000 won Super Heavyweight bronze at the Sydney Olympics. Results were:
Defeated Calvin Brock (USA) RSCO-4
Defeated Samuel Peter (Nigeria) PTS (14-3)
Lost to Audley Harrison (Great Britain) PTS (16-32)

Professional career
His first match was held at Madison Square Garden on 27 January 2001, against Chris Morris. He won the match via knockout at 2 minutes and 22 seconds in the first round.

Vidoz kept up a solid winning streak before encountering Zuri Lawrence, a "journeyman" fighter who, while proficient in his defensive ability, lacks a modicum of talent with regard to hitting his opponents (he has failed to record even a single knockout throughout his 12 years in the ring).  Lawrence was able to baffle Vidoz with his slippery movement in the ring and score a unanimous decision after eight rounds.

Vidoz bounced back with his next fight, registering a devastating knockout of Eduardo Sandivares at just under a minute into the fight.

Vidoz dropped out of serious contention with a ninth-round TKO loss to Russian boxer Nicolay Valuev on 9 October 2004 at the Messehalle in Erfurt, Germany.

On 6 June 2005, Vidoz captured vacant European (EBU) heavyweight title and IBF Inter-Continental title with a split decision over Timo Hoffmann. Vidoz followed this up with a victory over British fighter Michael Sprott, but his "Titanium Jaw" was later checked in a fight in July 2006 against Vladimir Virchis, who beat Vidoz by KO in the sixth.

After his loss to Virchis he rebounded with two more wins against Alexei Osokin and Antoine Palatis before losing to Virchis
one more time this time by unanimous decision.

He won two more fights against Zoltan Peto and Paul Butlin, winning both of them by knockout.

He faced Sinan Samil Sam for the vacant EBU (European) heavyweight title on 4 July 2008, but lost by majority decision. This fight was particularly strange, with the Manager of Samil screaming and bullying the judges at the end of the fight, to obtain a winning decision over Vidoz. He fought Matt Skelton for the vacant EBU European heavyweight title on 19 December 2008. He lost the fight after refusing to come out for round 10. In his most recent fight he defeated Tomasz Zeprzalka by TKO in the fourth round. On 18 December 2009, he fought Albert Sosnowski for the EBU heavyweight title but lost by unanimous decision after twelve rounds.

After his loss to Sosnowski he would go on to lose his next three fights to Claus Bertino, Alexander Ustinov and Kubrat Pulev. All of those losses came by decision.

He would go on to win his next two fights by decision against Gabor Farkas and Sandor Balogh. His most recent fight was on December 16, 2011 where he lost a decision to undefeated Matteo Modugno and has retired after deciding to hang up the gloves following the loss.

Professional boxing record

See also
Nino Benvenuti
Fabio Tuiach
Duilio Loi
Tiberio Mitri

External links
 

1970 births
Living people
People from Gorizia
Olympic boxers of Italy
Heavyweight boxers
Boxers at the 1996 Summer Olympics
Boxers at the 2000 Summer Olympics
Olympic bronze medalists for Italy
Olympic medalists in boxing
Medalists at the 2000 Summer Olympics
European Boxing Union champions
Italian male boxers
AIBA World Boxing Championships medalists
Mediterranean Games gold medalists for Italy
Mediterranean Games medalists in boxing
Competitors at the 1997 Mediterranean Games
Sportspeople from Friuli-Venezia Giulia